Angel Piccirillo (born January 8, 1994) is a middle-distance track runner and multiple time NCAA Division I All-American in cross country and Track.

High school career
Piccirillo placed 6th in the high school mile at 2010 Millrose Games in 4:59.38.

As a junior at Homer-Center Junior/Senior High School, Piccirillo placed 13th in Foot Locker Cross Country Championships in 17:47.

As a senior, Piccirillo placed 32nd in Foot Locker Cross Country Championships in 18:34.

As a senior in 2012, Piccirillo set a PIAA 1600 meter record in 4:39.42. Piccirillo placed 2nd in the mile in 4:45.05 at 2012 New Balance HS Indoor Nationals behind Hannah Meier of Grosse Pointe South High School.

College career
In 2017, Women's 4 x 800 metres relay World Leading representing the United States and Villanova University at 2017 Penn Relays - (Kelsey Margey, Stephanie Schappert, Siofra Buttner, Angel Piccirillo) won in 8:26.36.

Piccirillo won her 8th Penn Relays wheel in 2017 which is the most among collegian athletic career.

Piccirillo placed 20th at 2016 NCAA Division I Cross Country Championships to earn All-America honors. Piccirillo won the individual title at the 2016 Big East Conference Championship in cross country.

Piccirillo placed 2nd in mile at 2016 NCAA Division I Indoor Track and Field Championships in 4:36.26 behind Kaela Edwards of Oklahoma State University. Piccirillo ran 9:25.12 to place 13th in the 3000 meters at 2016 NCAA Division I Indoor Track and Field Championships.

Piccirillo placed 14th in 1500 meters at 2015 NCAA Division I Outdoor Track and Field Championships in 4:19.13.

Piccirillo, Michaela Wilkins, Nicky Akande, and Emily Lipari placed 2nd in Distance Medley Relay at 2013 NCAA Division I Indoor Track and Field Championships in 10:57.96 behind Rebecca Addison, Maya Long, Jillian Smith, Amanda Eccleston of University of Michigan.

Professional career

Competition record

As a sophomore at Villanova University, Piccirillo placed 30th in 800 meters at the 2015 USA Outdoor Track and Field Championships in 2:08.44.

Piccirillo placed 13th in 1500 meters at the 2017 USA Outdoor Track and Field Championships in 4:13.40.

Piccirillo training with Juventus won the mile at 2018 Villanova Invitational and raced the 1500 meters at 2018 Florida Relays in a time of 4:15.94.

References

External links

Angel Piccirillo profile at All-Athletics

1994 births
Living people
American female middle-distance runners
People from Homer City, Pennsylvania
Track and field athletes from Pennsylvania
African-American female track and field athletes
Track and field people from Pennsylvania
Villanova Wildcats women's cross country runners
Villanova Wildcats women's track and field athletes
American sportswomen
21st-century African-American sportspeople